Patricia E. Paetow High School (PHS) is a senior high school in unincorporated Harris County, Texas, in Greater Katy. It is a part of the Katy Independent School District.

The school opened in August 2017 to 9th and 10th grade students, relieving Katy High School and Morton Ranch High School. The more than  building, with a capacity of 3,000, has three stories. On December 17, 2020, Paetow’s football team had their season cut short due to Covid-19 Outbreak. On December 17, 2021, Paetow won the UIL Football Conference 5A Division 1 State Championship.

References

External links
 

Katy Independent School District high schools
2017 establishments in Texas
Educational institutions established in 2017
High schools in Harris County, Texas